For Rent: One Grammy One Gramps is a young adult fiction novel by Ivy Duffy Doherty, published 1982.

Plot summary
When the Barnes family come across a for a grammy and gramps for rent, the twins and their parents can't believe it, but respond anyway and become involved in a rewarding adventure they couldn't have imagined.

References

1982 American novels
American young adult novels